The Houston Zoo is a  zoological park located within Hermann Park in Houston, Texas, United States. The zoo houses over 6,000 animals from more than 600 species. It receives 2.1 million visitors each year and is the second most visited zoo in the United States, surpassed only by the San Diego Zoo. It is accredited by the Association of Zoos and Aquariums (AZA).

The Houston Zoo's mission statement is "The Houston Zoo connects communities with animals, inspiring action to save wildlife."

The zoo has been operated by the non-profit corporation Houston Zoo since 2002, and was previously operated by the City of Houston.

Exhibits

African Forest
Called the most ambitious project in the zoo's then 88-year history, the African Forest officially opened on December 10, 2010. The exhibit is home to many African species, including the Grant's zebra, White rhinoceros, Red River hog, Masai giraffe, Ostrich, chimpanzee, and western lowland gorilla. In 2011, the Houston Press gave the Houston Zoo the Best of Houston® Award for Best New Ecosystem. In November 24, 2020, a new male Pygmy hippopotamus named Silas first arrived to the Houston Zoo from the Henry Doorly Zoo in Omaha. Silas died due to an illness on October 10, 2022.

McNair Asian Elephant Habitat
The McNair Asian Elephant Habitat is home to the Houston Zoo's herd of Asian elephants. It features a 7,000-square-foot barn custom-built to house the bull elephants, a brand-new expanded habitat with a boardwalk with an unobstructed view of the elephants in their new yard, and a 160,000-gallon pool.

Birds
The Houston Zoo boasts one of the largest collections in any US zoo, with more than 800 birds from over 200 species. It includes a range of diverse birds, including the Mariana fruit dove, Micronesian kingfisher, Congo peafowl, and green-winged macaw.

Carnivores
Hosting the University of Houston's mascot Shasta the Cougar, the carnivore exhibit is also home to the lion, malayan tiger, clouded leopard, American black bear, African wild dog, leopard, and cheetah.

Sea lions
The Sea Lion Pool is located by the zoo entrance and is home to California sea lions Jonah, Cali, Kamia, TJ and her pup Max.

Allen H. and Ethel G. Carruth Natural Encounters
The Allen H. and Ethel G. Carruth Natural Encounters is a special building at the zoo where an adventure through an entire continent is simulated. Visitors learn about animals from the river’s edge, rainforest canopy, desert, and coral reef. Animals housed in the exhibit include the Asian small-clawed otter, Damaraland mole-rat, golden lion tamarin, golden-headed lion tamarin, meerkat, naked mole-rat, Pygmy marmoset, white-faced saki, Hoffmann's two-toed sloth, Eastern collared lizard, and Victoria crowned pigeon.

Wortham World of Primates
A winding boardwalk through a natural setting, this exhibit displays a variety of rare and endangered primates, including lemurs, monkeys, gibbons, and orangutans.

Texas Wetlands
Opened in March 2019, this new exhibit displays three native species: American alligators, whooping cranes, and bald eagles.

Reptile and Amphibian House
This building displays several venomous reptiles and exotic amphibians, including the blue iguana, crocodile monitor, and reticulated python.

Bug House
Opened in 2014, this exhibit displays several insects and arachnids from a variety of forests, jungles, and deserts.

John P. McGovern Children’s Zoo
This area features a petting zoo and a realistic bat cave.

South America's Pantanal
The South America's Pantanal is a 4.2-acre exhibit that opened on October 10th, 2020. It displays the blue-throated macaw, jaguar, giant river otter, Baird's tapir, greater rhea, capybara, and giant anteater.

Live webcams
The zoo offers nine exhibit webcams, including the Rhino Cam, Elephant Yard Cam, and Leafcutter Ant Cam.

Conservation
The Houston Zoo is an active partner in the AZA's Species Survival Plan (SSP) Program, a population management and conservation program for selected species housed in North American zoos.

The zoo supports more than a dozen conservation projects in Texas and across the globe that assist in the survival of endangered wildlife and habitats. Projects include the Houston toad, sea turtle, Attwater's prairie chicken, Galapagos tortoise, Bornean orangutan, elephant, clouded leopard, African lion, frogs, Brazilian tapir, rhinoceros, African wild dog, chimpanzee, okapi, and cheetah.

Gallery

References

External links

 Houston Zoo
 Houston zoo virtual tour

Zoos in Texas
Culture of Houston
Zoo
1922 establishments in Texas
Buildings and structures in Houston
Zoos established in 1922
Hermann Park